Grime may refer to:

 Dirt, in the form of black, ingrained dust
 Grime (music genre), a genre of music
 Grime (album), a 2001 album by Iniquity
 Grime (video game), a 2021 Metroidvania video game
 "Grime", a 2022 song by Dallas Woods
 Helen Grime (born 1981), Scottish composer

Other uses
 GrimE, a LucasArts adventure game
 Reverse graffiti or "grime writing", a method of creating images on walls or other surfaces

See also
 Grimes (disambiguation)